József Gyönyörű (19 March 1925 – 18 September 1999) was a Hungarian sports shooter. He competed in the 25 metre pistol event at the 1960 Summer Olympics.

References

External links
 

1925 births
1999 deaths
Hungarian male sport shooters
Olympic shooters of Hungary
Shooters at the 1960 Summer Olympics
Sportspeople from Hajdú-Bihar County